Ilukpelessa may refer to:

 Ilukpelessa (7°1'N 80°54'E), a village in Sri Lanka
 Ilukpelessa (7°27'N 80°54'E), a village in Sri Lanka
 Ilukpelessa (7°7'N 80°49'E), a village in Sri Lanka